Clementon Park and Splash World is a mid-sized combination theme park and water park in Clementon, Camden County, New Jersey, United States. Also known as Clementon Lake Park, it is one of the world's oldest operating amusement parks and is one of only thirteen trolley parks that are still in the United States. It was owned and operated by Clementon Lake Holdings LLC a subsidiary of Premier Parks, LLC. The park had been closed since September 2019 and was put up for auction on March 23, 2021. At the auction, the park in its entirety was purchased by Indiana Beach Holdings, LLC (now known as IB Parks & Entertainment), a company operated by real estate developer Gene Staples, for $2,370,000, with plans to reopen later in 2021
The park successfully reopened on June 25, 2021.

History

1907–1919
The park was founded in 1907 by New Jersey Assemblyman Theodore B. Gibbs (October 17, 1838 – October 27, 1909) and his sons, Edgar B. and Willard. Theodore Gibbs was a Civil War veteran who was a corporal in Company D, Twenty-ninth New Jersey Volunteers. He held many local offices including postmaster and sheriff; he was also a member of the Atlantic City Railroad's Board of Directors.

The amusement park was a popular destination in the early decades of the twentieth century with a trolley running from Camden, New Jersey, to the park entrance. In the early twentieth century, amusement parks were built at the end of trolley lines to encourage weekend ridership.

1920–1939
In the 1920s, the park included a nickelodeon movie theater, a "dancing casino", a steam-driven carousel, the Jack Rabbit roller coaster, and a "razzle-dazzle" ride. The Jack Rabbit roller coaster was considered state-of-the-art when added to the park in 1919 for the cost of $80,000, equal to $ today.

On June 22, 1931, a fire almost destroyed the amusement park. According to The New York Times, "a vivid pyrotechnic display and the successive reports of exploding cartridges added to the spectacular aspect of a fire which swept through part of Clementon Park, a South Jersey pleasure resort." The fire had reached the cartridge supply of the shooting gallery, setting off explosions. Firemen from six adjoining towns fought the fire which was contained to the shooting gallery and a "pretzel ride." The damages were estimated to be $2,000, equal to $ today.

Socialist presidential candidate Norman Thomas campaigned at Clementon Park in 1932. In a July 4 speech in front of 3,500 people, Thomas said, "It is not against foreign domination we must fight, but against a system that denies us bread, security and any assurance of peace. The men of 1776, in convention assembled at Philadelphia, found no successors in the old party conventions at Chicago in 1932."

In 1936, Philadelphia boxer Al Ettore trained at Clementon Park for the heavyweight title fight against Joe Louis to occur in Philadelphia on September 22, 1936. Thousands of fight fans visited the park to see Ettore train. On September 20, 1936, a  section of grandstand collapsed under the weight of about 500 spectators. No one was seriously injured.

1940–1969
Throughout the 1930s to 1950s, Clementon Park's ballroom hosted dance marathons that were hosted by various celebrities such as Red Skelton and Dick Clark. Clementon Park survived the Depression by holding these marathons, offering a $100 prize (equal to $ today) to partners who lasted the longest.

1970–1999
In 1977, the Gibbs family sold Clementon Lake Park to Abram Baker (1904–1994). Baker owned a nightclub in Miami, Florida, and the Fascination Parlour in Atlantic City, New Jersey. From 1955 to 1968, he owned Glen Echo Park, Maryland.

In 1979, operation of the park was turned over to Larry Baker, Abe's son.

2000–2019
In 2007, the park was purchased by Adrenaline Family Entertainment for an undisclosed amount. Over the next three years, Adrenaline Family Entertainment made major renovations and added attractions to bring renewed life to the park. Laguna Kahuna, a large interactive water playland, was added in 2008, followed by Ring of Fire and Thunder Drop in 2010, and Torpedo Rush in 2011.

On November 21, 2011, the park was purchased by Gary Story and Kieran Burke of Premier Parks, LLC through a new subsidiary, Clementon Lake Holdings LLC. Big Wave Bay, a 23,000 square foot wave pool, was added for the 2012 season.

For the 2019 season, the park added four new rides; a swinging ship, Tilt-A-Whirl, Scrambler, and a kiddy coaster, Dragon Coaster. The latter ride had been relocated from Bowcraft Amusement Park in Scotch Plains, New Jersey, which had closed permanently the season beforehand.

Attractions

Roller coasters

Thrill rides

Family rides

Children's rides

Water rides

Closure and sale
On September 8, 2019, the park abruptly closed without warning, despite tickets being sold for future events, and other planned events later in the season had been canceled.

Following the closure, TD Bank filed a lawsuit against the park owners for failing to make payments on a $4.5 million loan. On January 25, 2021, a court order granted Howard Samuels and Rally Capital Advisors, receivership of the park.

On February 19, 2021, Capital Recovery Group LLC, acting on behalf of its client, Howard Samuels, issued a press release announcing the sale of the park at a public auction to be held on March 23, 2021. During this time, it was also reported that a local investors group, Fresh Development LLC, was in the process of raising the $7 million needed to buy and rejuvenate the park.

On March 23, 2021, the park auction commenced, and the park in its entirety was sold to an undisclosed buyer for $2,370,000. The buyer was quickly revealed to be real estate developer Gene Staples, who had bought and reopened the closed Indiana Beach amusement park in Monticello, Indiana, the year before.

2021
Following a two-year hiatus, Clementon Park and Splash World reopened on June 25, 2021. All eight of the waterpark attractions were open, but only a limited number of the thrill and family rides were in operation. Discounted admission tickets were offered through end of June.

References

External links 

Official website
IB Parks & Entertainment

Clementon Amusement Park aerial photo
 Clementon's entry on ultimaterollercoaster.com

1907 establishments in New Jersey
Amusement parks in New Jersey
Buildings and structures in Camden County, New Jersey
Clementon, New Jersey
Tourist attractions in Camden County, New Jersey
Premier Parks, LLC
IB Parks & Entertainment